Pentre Galar (or Pentregalar, Pentre-Galar) is a small settlement in the Preseli Mountains south of the village of Crymych, north Pembrokeshire, Wales, on the A478 Cardigan to Tenby road. The western part of the settlement lies in the parish of Mynachlog-ddu and the eastern part in Llanfyrnach parish.

Name
The English translation for pentre is village, and galar can mean mourning, sorrow or grief. The origin of this name is obscure.

Geography
Most of the terrain is above . Land use is agricultural, with a rectilinear field pattern. Minor roads connect Pentre Galar with the villages of Hermon, Glandwr and Mynachlog-ddu, and most houses are alongside the main road. The part of the settlement to the west of the A478 lies within the Pembrokeshire Coast National Park.

History

The land surrounding Pentre Galar was enclosed by Act of Parliament in 1812, resulting in the orderly layout of small, rectangular fields. Dyfed Archaeological Trust suggests earlier settlement, and notes that the main road (now the A478) through the village is marked on an early map as a medieval route, but was turnpiked between 1791 and 1809 under the Whitland Turnpike Trust.
The Royal Commission records the name Pentre Galar from an early 20th century map, and has in its collection aerial photographs of old field banks taken in 1999.

Ty-mawr
Ty-mawr, on the corner of the road leading to Hermon, was in earlier times an inn on the Cardigan to Clynderwen coach route. It saw its first motor car in 1909. Owner and builder of the inn, James Davies (Siams Dafi, 17581844), a preacher and community stalwart, was the force behind much road improvement in the area, including the main road, in the years 1809 to 1812. A memorial stone to Davies was erected in 2007, across the road from the inn.

Preseli transmitting station
The Preseli transmitting station was constructed in 1962 near the summit of Crugiau Dwy, and by 1973 was broadcasting colour TV to West Wales, fairly late in comparison with the rest of the UK, owing to the sparse population in the area it served.

Notable people
The poet, Independent minister and Marxist Thomas Evan Nicholas (Niclas y Glais, 1879–1971) was born and brought up in Pentre Galar; he was born in the cottage Blaenwaun Felen and brought up in 'Y Llety', a smallholding on the slopes of Foel Dyrch and Crugiau Dwy. A memorial stone to T E Nicholas was unveiled on Crugiau Dwy in October 2019.

The poet and Independent minister Daniel John Davies (1885–1970) was born at Waunfelen, a cottage in Pentre Galar. He was taught the rules of cynghanedd (Welsh strict metre poetry) in Pentregalar by William Nicholas, T E Nicholas' elder brother.

References

Villages in Pembrokeshire